Jonathan Esteban Álvarez Isaza (born June 27, 1987) is a Colombian footballer who plays a midfielder, most recently for Juventude.

Career
On 14 March 2019, Álvarez joined Campeonato Brasileiro Série C side Juventude after a spell with Peruvian side Sport Huancayo. Álvares arrived in poor physical condition, and therefore did not make his debut with the club before he was released by mutual consent in May 2019.

Honours
Deportivo Cali
Copa Colombia winner: 2010

Atlético Nacional
Copa Colombia winner: 2012
Superliga Colombiana winner: 2012

América de Cali
Primera B winner: 2016

References

External links
 

1987 births
Living people
Footballers from Medellín
Colombian footballers
Categoría Primera A players
Categoría Primera B players
Envigado F.C. players
Sport Club Internacional players
Deportivo Pereira footballers
Leones F.C. footballers
América de Cali footballers
Deportivo Cali footballers
Atlético Nacional footballers
Atlético Huila footballers
Atlético Junior footballers
La Equidad footballers
Colombian expatriate footballers
Expatriate footballers in Brazil
Expatriate footballers in Peru
Association football midfielders